The Stavros Niarchos Foundation (SNF) was established in 1996 to honor Greek shipping magnate Stavros Niarchos (1909–1996). Niarchos was one of the world's largest transporters of oil and owned the largest supertanker fleet of his time.

Organization 
The foundation's board of directors includes:

Philip Niarchos, co-president (son of Stavros Niarchos)
Spyros Niarchos, co-president (son of Stavros Niarchos)
Andreas Dracopoulos, co-president (great-nephew of Stavros Niarchos)
George Agouridis
Heini Murer

The foundation has staff in Athens, Greece; Monte Carlo, Monaco; and New York City.

Since 1996, the Stavros Niarchos Foundation has provided more than 4,700 grants totaling more than $3 billion to non-profit agencies.

In 2012, in response to the socio-economic crisis in Greece, SNF announced a grant initiative of additional $130 million (€100 million) over three years to help ease the adverse effects of the deepening crisis. A new initiative, Recharging the Youth, was announced in 2013 to help create new opportunities for Greece's younger generations and committed an additional $130 million (€100 million). Upon the completion of the first phase of the program against the Greek Crisis, a second phase was introduced in June 2015, announcing the allocation of another $112 million (€100 million), intensifying the efforts against the ongoing crisis in Greece and providing immediate support to the most vulnerable groups of society.

SNF announced a $100 million global initiative to help alleviate the effects of the COVID-19 pandemic in April 2020.

SNF's grants include:

Aghia Sophia Children's Hospital, Athens, Greece
Children's Soccer Training
Columbia University, New York City
Consorzio Farsi Prossimo
Cultural Heritage without Borders
MIT Enterprise Forum via the Greek Technology Enterprise Forum, Athens, Greece
Cutty Sark Trust, Greenwich, London, United Kingdom
ECOWEEK
Museum of the Macedonian Struggle, Kastoria, Greece
Fulbright Program in Greece
Global Fund for Women, San Francisco
Hellenic Fire Service, Greece
Hospital for Special Surgery, New York City
Lymphatic Education & Research Network (LE&RN)
Megali Sholi
Museum of Modern Art (MoMA), New York City
Marie Curie (charity), London
National Center for Emergency Care (EKAV), Greece
Natural History Museum of Crete, Heraklion, Crete, Greece
Pro-Natura International, Paris
Queens Public Library, New York City
Rockefeller University, New York City
Simon Fraser University, Burnaby, British Columbia, Canada
SNF Agora Institute Johns Hopkins University, Baltimore, Maryland
Stavros Niarchos Foundation Cultural Center, Faliro bay, Athens, Greece
Stavros Niarchos Foundation Library, New York Public Library, New York City
Wikimedia Foundation
Yale University, New Haven, Connecticut, United States

References

External links 

 

Niarchos family
Foundations based in Greece
Organizations established in 1996
1996 establishments in Greece